Parliamentary elections were held in the breakaway republic of Transnistria on 10 December 2000. 42 Out of 43 seats were up for election, most of which were won by independent candidates. Women made up 4 of the 42 elected representatives. Grigore Mărăcuţă was elected for a third term as speaker, having the support of 39 out of 41 representatives present at his election.

Results

References

Elections in Transnistria
2000 elections in Moldova
2000 in Transnistria
Election and referendum articles with incomplete results